Geoffrey Heskett (3 August 1929 – 5 February 2023) was an Australian basketball player. He competed in the men's tournament at the 1956 Summer Olympics.

Heskett died in Melbourne on 5 February 2023, at the age of 93.

References

External links

1929 births
2023 deaths
Australian men's basketball players
Olympic basketball players of Australia
Basketball players at the 1956 Summer Olympics
Basketball players from Melbourne